The 1946–47 OB I bajnokság season was the 10th season of the OB I bajnokság, the top level of ice hockey in Hungary. Five teams participated in the league, and MTK Budapest won the championship.

Regular season

External links
 Season on hockeyarchives.info

Hun
OB I bajnoksag seasons
1946–47 in Hungarian ice hockey